Guide Bridge Sidings is a stabling point located in Guide Bridge, Greater Manchester, England. The depot is situated to the east of Guide Bridge station, on the line to Stalybridge.

The depot code is GU.

History 
In the 1980s, Class 40 and 76 locomotives could be seen at the depot.

Present 
As of 2020, the depot is currently occupied by Swietelsky and Babcock rail and is used for stabling and maintaining their fleet of: tampers, Ballast Regulators and track finishing machines. The depot is also occasionally used by Network Rail, Harsco Rail, Colas Rail and Balfour Beatty for their: tampers, Stoneblowers, track stabilisers, single line track relayers, drain suckers, ballast cleaners, Ballast Regulators, Rail Grinders, Overhead Line MPVs and the Track inspection MPV while they are working on their appropriate jobs.

References

Sources

Railway depots in England
Rail transport in Greater Manchester